Hannes Sigurbjörn Jónsson (born 25 April 1975) is the chairman of the Icelandic Basketball Association and a board member of FIBA Europe.

History

Icelandic Basketball Association
Hannes joined the board of the Icelandic Basketball Association in 1999. In 2001 he was voted the vice chairman and in 2006 he was voted as the chairman.

FIBA Europe
Hannes was voted into the board of FIBA Europe in 2014.

References

1975 births
Living people
Hannes S. Jonsson